Llano Grande may refer to:
Llano Grande, Coclé, Panama
Llano Grande, Herrera, Panama
Llano Grande, Texas, United States
Llano Grande, Veraguas, Panama
Llano Grande, Mexico